Vada is a category of savoury fried snacks native to South India. Vadas can be described variously as fritters, cutlets, or dumplings. Alternative names for this food include vadai, vade, and bada. Vadas are sometimes stuffed with vegetables and traditionally served with chutneys and sambar. 

In North India and Pakistan, Bhalla is a similar food. It is sold in chaat shops and kiosks; Green bean paste is added with spices, which is then deep fried to make croquets. They are then garnished with dahi (yogurt), Saunth chutney (dried ginger and tamarind sauce) and spices. Bhalla is usually served cold unlike the Aloo Tikki.

The various types of vadas are made from different ingredients, ranging from legumes (such as medu vada of South India) to potatoes (such as batata vada of West India). They are often served as a breakfast item or a snack, and also used in other food preparations (such as dahi vada and vada pav).

History 

According to K. T. Achaya, Vadai (Vada) was popular among ancient Tamils during 100 BCE – 300 CE. A type of vada is mentioned as "vataka" in Manasollasa, a 12th-century Sanskrit encyclopedia compiled by Someshvara III, who ruled from present-day Karnataka. In this recipe, green beans are soaked, de-skinned, and ground to a paste. The paste is shaped into balls and deep-fried. Early literature from the present-day states of Bihar and Uttar Pradesh also mentions bara (vada) and mungaura (a vada made from mung).

Many immigrants from Uttar Pradesh and Bihar migrated to places such as Trinidad and Tobago, Guyana, Suriname, South Africa, Mauritius, and Fiji in the mid-19th century to the early 20th century as indentured laborers. Bara became an important part of the Indian cuisine in these countries. In Trinidad and Tobago, bara became a component of one of their most famous street foods called doubles. Doubles is served with two baras filled with curried channa and topped with various chutneys or achars.

Preparation 

Vadai  (Vada) may be made from legumes, sago or potatoes. Commonly used legumes include pigeon pea, chickpea, black gram and green gram. Vegetables and other ingredients are added to improve taste and nutritive value.

For legume-based vadas, the legumes (dal) are soaked with water, and then ground to a batter. The batter is then seasoned with other ingredients, such as cumin seeds, onion, curry leaves (sometimes previously sauteed), salt, chillies or black pepper grains. Often ginger and baking soda are added to the seasoning in shops to increase the fluffy texture and improve fermentation for large batches. The mixture is then shaped and deep-fried, resulting in vadas with a crispy skin and fluffy centre. The preparation of kalmi vadas involves cutting the resulting product into pieces and re-frying them.

Serving

Vadas are often eaten as snacks or as an accompaniment to another dish. In restaurants, they can be ordered as an à la carte item, but are not the main course. They are preferably eaten freshly fried, while still hot and crunchy. They are served with a variety of dips including sambar, watery or dry chutneys and dahi (yogurt, often called "curd" in Indian English).

Medu vadas are typically served along with a main course such as dosa, idli, or pongal. Sambar and coconut chutneys are the standard accompaniments for medu vadas.

Varieties

The various types of vadas include:

 Medu vada, made with urad dal (black gram) flour. This vada is shaped like a doughnut with a hole in the middle (i.e. an approximate torus). It is the most common vada type throughout South India and the most recognisable throughout India. It is also known as ulundhu vadai, uddina vade, minapa vada (Telugu) and  uzhunnu vada.
 Paruppu vada, is an exclusive staple food authentic of Tamil Nadu made with yellow split peas  green chillies, whole red chillies onions and salt(nothing more nothing less). It tastes entirely different to other similarly shaped vada's available in south India made of some type of lentils and an overt dose of spices.
 Masala vada, made with toor dal (whole lentils) and shaped roughly like a disk. It is also referred to as aamai vadai in Tamil due to its resemblance to a tortoise. Other names include parippu vada (Malayalam), masala vade (Kannada).
 Maddur vade, a type of onion vada unique to the state of Karnataka. It is very popular in the Maddur town of Karnataka and has a very different taste from any other vada types. It is typically larger than other vada types and is flat, crispy (to the point of breaking when flexed) without a hole in the middle. It originally started as a snack at the Maddur railway station on the Bengaluru – Mysuru railway line. Maddur was the halfway mark on this line and most trains would stop there with passengers buying this tasty snack.
 Ambode, made from "split chickpeas without the seed coat" i.e. kadale bele in Kannada.
 Mosaru Vade, made by cooking a vada normally, and then serving the vada in a mix of dahi (yogurt) and spices.
 Eerulli bajji, also known as uli vada (Malayalam): made with onion. It is roughly round-shaped, and may or may not have a hole in the middle.
 Rava vada, made of semolina.
 Bonda, made with potatoes, garlic and spices coated with lentil paste and fried. In some regions, a bonda is considered a distinct snack food, and is not held to be a type of vada.
 Sabudana vada is another variety of vada popular in Maharashtra, made from pearl sago.
 Thavala vada, a vada made with different types of lentils.
 Keerai vada (spinach vada) is made with spinach-type leaf vegetables along with lentils.
 Batata vada (potato vada). Often served in the form of vada pav, with a bun (known as a pav) and chutney; a common street food in Maharashtra, especially in Mumbai.
 Keema vada, a vada made from minced meat, typically smaller and more crisp than other vada types with no hole in the middle.
 Vada curry or vada sambhar is a gravy dish that is made with prepared vadas blended with a vegetables in a curry or a gravy format
 Bhajani cha vada: a vada made from a flour made from bajri, jawar, wheat, rice, channa dal, cumin, coriander seeds etc. A speciality of Maharashtra, very nutritious too
Doubles: a snack is made with two baras filled with curry channa (curried chickpeas) and various chutneys.

See also

 Burmese fritters, a similar class of fritters in Myanmar
Fried dough foods
Hushpuppy, a similar dish of the Southern United States
 Akara
 Falafel
 Korokke
 List of doughnut varieties
 Boortsog

References

External links

Indian fast food
Street food
Doughnuts
Indian snack foods
Karnataka cuisine
Andhra cuisine
Tamil cuisine
Telangana cuisine
Sri Lankan snack food
South Indian cuisine
Kerala cuisine
Fijian cuisine
Sinhalese New Year foods
Surinamese cuisine